Seh Chah (also Romanized as Seh Chāh) is a village in Baghak Rural District, in the Central District of Tangestan County, Bushehr Province, Iran. At the 2006 census, its population was 34, in 7 families.

References 

Populated places in Tangestan County